The 2018–19 season was SK Slavia Prague's 26th season in the Czech First League. The team competed in Czech First League, the Czech Cup, the UEFA Champions League and the UEFA Europa League.

Season Events

On 27 April, Slavia gathered three points against Olomouc (match-week 30), which was sufficient to be mathematically assured that the team will finish ahead of Sparta in the league table.

Squad

Out on loan

Unregistered

Transfers

In

Loans in

Out

Loans out

Released

Pre-season and friendlies

Competitions

Overall record

Czech First League

Regular stage

League table

Results summary

Results by round

Matches

Championship group

League table

Results summary

Results by round

Matches

Czech Cup

UEFA Champions League

Qualifying rounds

Third qualifying round

UEFA Europa League

Group stage

Knockout phase

Round of 32

Round of 16

Quarter-finals

Squad statistics

Appearances and goals

|-
|colspan="14"|Players away from Slavia Prague on loan:

|-
|colspan="14"|Players who left Slavia Prague during the season:

|}

Goal scorers

Disciplinary record

References

External links
Official website

Slavia Prague
SK Slavia Prague seasons
Slavia Prague
Slavia Prague
Czech Republic football championship-winning seasons